The Best Actress Award is one of main awards of the Feature Film Competition at the Karlovy Vary International Film Festival. It is conferred on the best actress, or the best actresses ex aequo.

Best Actress Award

References

External links
 The official festival site / History

Karlovy Vary International Film Festival
Czech film awards
International film awards